Myrthes Gomes de Campos (1875-1965) was the first female lawyer in Brazil. She completed law school in 1898, and in 1906 she was admitted to the Instituto dos Advogados do Brasil (Institute of Brazilian Lawyers) and allowed to practice law.

See also
 List of first women lawyers by nationality

References

1875 births
1965 deaths
Brazilian women lawyers
20th-century Brazilian lawyers